Bicyclus howarthi is a butterfly in the family Nymphalidae. It is found in Cameroon, Equatorial Guinea and Gabon.

References

Elymniini
Butterflies described in 1963